Asrel Kimmani Sutherland (born 8 March 1993) is a Belizean international footballer who plays for San Pedro Pirates FC, as a defender.

Career
He has played club football for Police United.

He made his international debut for Belize in 2018.

References

1993 births
Living people
Belizean footballers
Belize international footballers
Police United FC (Belize) players
San Pedro Pirates FC players
Association football defenders
Belize under-20 international footballers
Belize youth international footballers